Hans-Henning Korb (born 1988 in Berlin, Germany) is a contemporary artist based in Berlin. Hans-Henning Korb holds a BFA and an MFA in visual arts from the Berlin University of the Arts, in Berlin. He studied in the class of Hito Steyerl and at the Olafur Eliasson's Institute for Spatial Experiments (Institut für Raumexperimente)., and was a visiting student at the School of Fine Arts at the Addis Ababa University in Ethiopia and the Hunter College in New York City. His work has been exhibited internationally, in venues such as the Empty Gallery, Hong Kong (2016); Neue Nationalgalerie, Berlin, Germany  (2014); Photo LA, Los Angeles, CA, United States (2012); and many more.

Art
Hans-Henning Korb has developed a mode of art practice that transgresses traditional categories, combining sculptures, installations, and performances that involve music, film, computer animation, virtual worlds, plants, and organic processes. His aesthetics gives voice to complex contemporary human conditions and reflect on the questions that come to head as of late in contemporary life, such as the question of human autonomy in relation to both ecology and technology. In most works, the physical body is present. You could say there are no bodies in the digital sphere, so it's interesting that Korb's works deal with this topic and explores the various layers of the human body and consciousness as well as its natural and technological surroundings. Fascinated by the alchemical properties of plants and foods Korb most recently created a series of installations entitled Kaya Cynara that look at the emitting energy of the artichoke plant.

Exhibitions
Individual Exhibitions
 Kaya Cynara, Empty Gallery, Hong Kong (2016)
 Fight, Center, Berlin, Germany (2013). With Daniel Jacoby.
Selected Group Exhibitions

2017 
OF FUTURE NOWS 2017→ ∞, FESTIVAL OF FUTURE NOWS, Hamburger Bahnhof, Berlin, Germany

2016 
 Master of Fine Arts Student Exhibition (Meisterschüler Ausstellung), Berlin University of the Arts, Berlin, Germany
 A Reservoir Of Trust. The Slohagenhallah Project, French-German Cultural Center Ramallah, Palestinia
 NOWs: Launch NAVEL in LA, Navel, Los Angeles, CA, United States

2014 
 Hunter MFA Open Studios, Hunter College, New York, NY, United States
 Festival of Future Nows, Neue Nationalgalerie, Berlin, Germany  Directed by Olafur Eliasson, and co-directed by Christina Werner, and Eric Ellingsen.
 Walk-in-Progress, Vitamin Space, Guangzhou, China 
 Aeaeaeae, Hans-Henning Korb, Robert Lippok & Raul Walch: Molding Versions into Reality, Grey Sheep, Berlin, Germany

2013 
 Accidental Accomplishment, Institut für Raumexperimente, Berlin, Germany 
 Agora Collects, Agora, Berlin, Germany 
 100° Berlin 2013, Hebbel am Ufer, Berlin

2012 
 Addis Foto Fest 2012, Alle School of Fine Art and Design, Addis Abeba University, and Modern Art Museum, Addis Ababa, Ethiopia 
 Jan Meda – Großes Feld, Addis Ababa, Ethiopia 
 Transnatural Festival 2012: The State of Autonomy, Nemo Science Center, Amsterdam, the Netherlands 
 Translation Acts, The World Is Not Fair – Die Große Weltausstellung 2012, Institut für Raumexperimente at Tempelhofer Feld, Berlin, Germany  (catalogue)
 Glasauge, Institut für Raumexperimente, Bunker, Berlin, Germany

Selected Screenings 
YUWVUWVY, 2011. Video in collaboration with Aeaeaeae.
 Long Night of Transformation, Haus am Lützowplatz, Berlin, Germany (2012)
 Photo LA, Los Angeles, CA, United States (2012)
 Time is Light, 25 Positions. Photography, Video art and Sculpture, Hamburg, Germany (2011)
 Institut für Raumexperimente Videoscreening, Goethe Institute, São Paulo, Brazil (2011)

References

External links 

 
 Empty Gallery website

German contemporary artists
German sculptors
Artists from Berlin
German installation artists
Berlin University of the Arts alumni
1988 births
Living people
Alumni